José Alberto Benítez Román (born 14 November 1981) is a Spanish former professional road bicycle racer, who competed professionally between 2006 and 2011 for the  and  teams. His first major achievement was winning the mountains classification in the 2007 Vuelta a Andalucía.

Major results

 Vuelta a León – 1 stage (2005)
 Vuelta a Tenerife – 1 stage (2004)
 Volta a Coruña – 1 stage (2004)
 Volta a Portugal do Futuro – 1 stage (2003)

External links
Profile at Saunier Duval-Prodir official website 

Eurosport profile

Living people
1981 births
Spanish male cyclists
People from Chiclana de la Frontera
Sportspeople from the Province of Cádiz
Cyclists from Andalusia